G7 Welcoming Committee Records was a Canadian independent record label based in Winnipeg, Manitoba.  The label mostly released material by artists and speakers with a radical left-wing point of view.

History
G7 Welcoming Committee Records was founded by Chris Hannah and Jord Samolesky of punk band, Propagandhi, and their friend, Regal, in 1997. The label operated out of Winnipeg's The Old Market Autonomous Zone.  During its years of operation about 50 albums were released.

The label ceased operations in April 2008 although it did briefly come out of hibernation in 2010 to release a 3-track EP of Propagandhi songs from 1993 to 1996 as a benefit for Partners In Health.

In early 2015, it was announced on the G7 website that none of their previous releases were available for purchase as either physical copies or downloadable albums, but that most of their catalog was available on music streaming sites.

Political aspect
According to the G7 website, when the label was established, the founders hoped "to create a label that politically radical bands and speakers could unflinchingly support and call home; where the driving force behind the label's output was social change and radical thought; and where the structure of the organization didn't contradict itself by mimicking the structures of unbalanced power and hierarchy in the profit-driven corporate world." To this end the label incorporates the economic structure Parecon proposed by Robin Hahnel and Michael Albert.

The name is a reference to the G7 which brings together the world's richest and most powerful countries in yearly summits to discuss the global political and economic society and to make collective decisions. The label's website explains, "The G7 Welcoming Committee is an idea of resistance [...] A 'Welcoming Committee' to tell them, with words and actions, what we think of their power and neo-colonialism, around the world and at home, and that people are willing to fight back ..."

Associated bands
The following artists have released albums on G7:

 Bakunin's Bum
 ...But Alive
 Che: Chapter 127
 Clann Zú
 Consolidated
 GFK
 Giant Sons
 Head Hits Concrete
 Hiretsukan
 The (International) Noise Conspiracy
 I Spy
 Jamaica Plain
 Greg MacPherson
 Malefaction
 Mico
 Painted Thin
 Propagandhi
 Randy
 The Rebel Spell
 Red Fisher
 Rhythm Activism
 John K. Samson
 Subhumans
 Submission Hold
 Swallowing Shit
 warsawpack
 The Weakerthans

It also carries spoken word material by Noam Chomsky, Ward Churchill, Ann Hansen, and Howard Zinn.

Compilation albums
 Return of the Read Menace (1999)
 Take Penacilin Now (2005)

See also
 List of record labels

References

External links
 G7 Welcoming Committee Records – Official website
 Propagandhi
 Profile and interview at Lost at Sea magazine
 Profile at Exclaim.ca

 
Canadian independent record labels
Record labels established in 1997
Record labels disestablished in 2008
1997 establishments in Manitoba
2008 disestablishments in Manitoba
Canadian companies established in 1997
Canadian companies disestablished in 2008
Anarchism in Canada
Far-left politics in Canada
Alternative rock record labels
Punk record labels
Manitoba music
Music and politics